The 2012–13 OJHL season is the 19th season of the Ontario Junior Hockey League (OJHL) and the third since the league existed as two separate bodies in 2009–10. The twenty-two teams of the North, South, East and West Divisions will play 55-game schedules.

Come February, the top teams of each division will play down for the Frank L. Buckland Trophy, the OJHL championship.  The winner of the Buckland Cup will compete in the Central Canadian Junior "A" championship, the Dudley Hewitt Cup.  If successful against the winners of the Northern Ontario Junior Hockey League and Superior International Junior Hockey League, the champion would then move on to play in the Canadian Junior Hockey League championship, the 2013 Royal Bank Cup.

Changes 
Conferences have changed to "Northeast" and "Southwest" to better fit retraction.
Huntsville Otters have ceased operations, jumped down to Georgian Mid-Ontario Junior C Hockey League.
Brampton Capitals have ceased operations.
Vaughan Vipers have ceased operations.
Peterborough Stars have ceased operations and merge with Lindsay Muskies.
Markham Waxers suspend operations for 2012-13 season.

Final standings
Note: GP = Games played; W = Wins; L = Losses; OTL = Overtime losses; SOL = Shootout losses; GF = Goals for; GA = Goals against; PTS = Points; x = clinched playoff berth; y = clinched division title; z = clinched conference title; w = eliminated.

Shaded Green denotes divisional and conference leader, red is the other divisional leader, blue are teams in line for playoff seeds 3 through 8 of their conference.

Teams listed on the official league website.

Standings listed by Pointstreak on official league website.

2012-13 Frank L. Buckland Trophy Playoffs

Playoff results are listed by Pointstreak on the official league website.

Dudley Hewitt Cup Championship
Hosted by the North Bay Trappers in North Bay, Ontario.  The St. Michael's Buzzers lost the final.

Round Robin
St. Michael's Buzzers 4 - Soo Thunderbirds (NOJHL) 2
St. Michael's Buzzers 5 - North Bay Trappers (NOJHL) 2
Minnesota Wilderness (SIJHL) 3 - St. Michael's Buzzers 0

Semi-final
St. Michael's Buzzers 5 - Soo Thunderbirds (NOJHL) 1

Final
Minnesota Wilderness (SIJHL) 4 - St. Michael's Buzzers 3 OT

Scoring leaders 
Note: GP = Games played; G = Goals; A = Assists; Pts = Points; PIM = Penalty minutes

Leading goaltenders 
Note: GP = Games played; Mins = Minutes played; W = Wins; L = Losses: OTL = Overtime losses; SL = Shootout losses; GA = Goals Allowed; SO = Shutouts; GAA = Goals against average

Award winners
 Top Scorer - Tyler Gjurich (Buffalo)
 Best Defenceman - Patrick McCarron (St. Michael's)
 Most Gentlemanly Player - Dean Klomp (Lindsay)
 Most Improved Player - John Carpino (North York)
 Most Valuable Player - Tyler Gjurich (Buffalo)
 Rookie of the Year - Tyler Gjurich (Buffalo)
 Coach of the Year - Michael Peca (Buffalo)
 Best Goaltender - Charlie Finn (Kingston)
 Humanitarian - Tyler Feaver (Whitby)
 Scholastic - Jordin Dunin (Newmarket)
 Top Prospect - Matt Buckles (St. Michael's)
 Playoff MVP - Shane Conacher (St. Michael's)
 Top Executive - Michael Peca (Buffalo)
 Top Trainer - Jack Williams (Buffalo)
 Volunteer of the Year - Mike Johnson (Orangeville)

Central Canada Cup Challenge

The second annual Central Canada Cup Challenge is an interleague all-star tournament hosted by Wellington, Ontario.  The event runs December 27–29, 2012.  The name of the event has been slightly altered from the 2011 event, probably in response to the creation of the Western Canada Cup by their rival Western leagues.

See: Central Canada Cup Challenge

Players selected in 2013 NHL Entry Draft
Rd 4 #98 Matt Buckles - Florida Panthers (St. Michael's Buzzers)
Rd 7 #209 Troy Josephs - Pittsburgh Penguins (St. Michael's Buzzers)

See also 
 2013 Royal Bank Cup
 Dudley Hewitt Cup
 List of OJHL seasons
 Northern Ontario Junior Hockey League
 Superior International Junior Hockey League
 Greater Ontario Junior Hockey League
 2012 in ice hockey
 2013 in ice hockey

References

External links 
 Official website of the Ontario Junior Hockey League
 Official website of the Canadian Junior Hockey League

Ontario Junior Hockey League seasons
OJHL